Brachytherium is an extinct genus of proterotheriid mammal from the Late Miocene to Late Pliocene of Argentina. It is represented by the type and only species B. cuspidatum, a taxon named in 1883 by Ameghino for a partial mandible with teeth. Though it was considered a dubious taxon at times, Brachytherium was revised as valid by Schmidt in 2015, who also synonymized the species Proterotherium gradatum and Lophogonodon paranensis, expanding the material known, all of which is from the Ituzaingó Formation. Some material previously referred to Brachytherium has been given the new name Neobrachytherium.

References

Proterotheriids
Miocene mammals of South America
Pliocene mammals of South America
Neogene Argentina
Chasicoan
Huayquerian
Montehermosan
Chapadmalalan
Fossils of Argentina
Fossil taxa described in 1883
Taxa named by Florentino Ameghino
Prehistoric placental genera
Ituzaingó Formation